Old Friends is an album by American singer-songwriter Guy Clark, released in 1988.

Track listing
 "Old Friends" (Guy Clark, Susanna Clark, Richard Dobson) – 3:12
 "Hands" (Clark, Joe Henry, Verlon Thompson) – 2:22
 "All Through Throwin' Good Love After Bad" (Clark, Richard Leigh) – 2:46
 "Immigrant Eyes" (Clark, Jim Murragh) – 3:37
 "Heavy Metal" (Clark, Jim McBride) – 3:02
 "Come From the Heart" (Susanna Clark, Richard Leigh) – 3:18
 "The Indian Cowboy" (Joe Ely) – 2:21
 "To Live Is to Fly" (Townes Van Zandt) – 3:15
 "Watermelon Dream" (Clark) – 3:23
 "Doctor Good Doctor" (Clark) – 2:33

Personnel
Guy Clark – vocals, guitar
Sam Bush – fiddle, mandolin, mandola
Rosanne Cash – background vocals
Rodney Crowell – background vocals
Vince Gill – guitar
Verlon Thompson – guitar, percussion, background vocals
Emmylou Harris – background vocals
Mike Henderson – guitar
Dave Pomeroy – bass

Production notes
Miles Wilkinson – producer, engineer
Dan Purcell – mastering

References

1988 albums
Guy Clark albums
Sugar Hill Records albums